Guanting could refer to the following places in China:

Guanting, Huailai County (官厅镇), in Hebei
Guanting, Julu County (官亭镇), in Hebei
Guanting, Minhe County (官亭镇), in Qinghai